This is a list of Japanese apple cultivars which includes apple cultivars, as well as hybrid cultivars, invented in Japan.

List 
 Akane which is named for the word Akane (meaning deep red).
 Sansa
 Fuji which is named after Fujisaki, Aomori.
 Yataka Fuji
 Daybreak Fuji
 Yahagi
 Indo
 Mutsu or Crispin which is named after the Mutsu Province.
 Shizuka
 Orin
 Shinano Sweet
 Tsugaru
 Toki

Further reading

References 

 
Japanese apple cultivars, list of